Helga Stentzel is a Russian-born visual artist, known for her ‘household surrealism’ series which uses clothing, kitchen utensils, books, bread, and more to create characters and scenes. She works across a wide range of media including illustration, photography, video and stop motion animation.

Early life and education 
Stentzel was born in Siberia, Russia. She studied at the Omsk State Institute of Technology and was awarded a BA in Graphic Design and Advertising from Central Saint Martins. She began her career as an art director in the advertising industry.

Work 
Stentzel is known for her use of household objects in her art, particularly food and laundry. She credits “simplicity”, “day-to-day activities”  and “observation without expectations” as key inspirations for her work.

In 2021 her works entitled Pegasus and Smoothie, a horse and a cow styled from laundry on a washing line, attracted international media coverage from outlets including El Colombiano, The Chosun Ilbo and Colossal.

Awards 
In 2020, Stentzel won Snackable Content Awards ‘Food Art Creator of the Year’.

See also 
 Surrealist Photography

References

External links 
 Official Website

Living people
21st-century women photographers
21st-century Russian women artists
Alumni of Central Saint Martins
Russian women photographers
Women surrealist artists
People from Siberia
Year of birth missing (living people)